Glasgow Museums is the group of museums and galleries owned by the City of Glasgow, Scotland. They hold about 1.6 million objects including over 60,000 art works, over 200,000 items in the human history collections, over 21,000 items relating to transport and technology, and over 585,000 natural history specimens. They are managed by Glasgow Life (formally Glasgow Sport and Culture), an 'arms length' external organisation contracted by Glasgow City Council to provide cultural, sporting and learning activities in the city. 

The museums and galleries are:
Burrell Collection
Gallery of Modern Art (GoMA)
Glasgow Museums Resource Centre
 Kelvin Hall (Museum store)
Kelvingrove Art Gallery and Museum
The Open Museum 
People's Palace
Provand's Lordship
Riverside Museum
Scotland Street School Museum
St Mungo Museum of Religious Life and Art

Repatriations 
Glasgow Museums has started repatriating stolen objects from their collections to their original cultures.

 India
 6 items stolen from shines and temples in the 19th Century
 tulwar and scabbard stolen from the collection of Nizam of Hyderabad and sold to Archibald Hunter in 1905
 Nigeria
 19 Benin Bronzes taken during the Benin Expedition of 1897
 Indigenous American tribes 
 A ghost shirt from the Lakota nation was the first object from Glasgow Museums to be repatriated in 1998
 25 items from Lakota and Oceti Sakowin tribes, sold and donated to Glasgow Museums by George Crager, who worked for the Buffalo Bill Wild West Show. These will be returned to the Cheyenne River Sioux and Oglala Sioux tribes.

See also
List of museums in Scotland, including other museums in Glasgow not part of Glasgow Museums

References

Museums in Glasgow